Djurgården may refer to:

Djurgården, a recreation park area and pleasure ground in Stockholm, Sweden
Djurgården, Linköping, a district of Linköping
Eläintarha (Swedish: Djurgården), a large park in Helsinki, Finland
Djurgårdens IF, a Swedish sports club
 Djurgårdens IF Dam - Women's soccer club